Daniels Bērziņš (born 6 February 1999) is a Latvian professional ice hockey forward who is currently a playing for Dinamo Riga of the Kontinental Hockey League (KHL).

Playing career
As a junior, Bērziņš played for SK Riga, before joining Dinamo Riga junior club HK Rīga of MHL in 2016. Next season he made his debut at senior level in KHL with Dinamo Riga, in win against Neftekhimik on 4 January 2018. He scored his first KHL goal same season on 1 March against Jokerit

Career statistics

Regular season and playoffs

International

References

External links

1999 births
Living people
Dinamo Riga players
Latvian ice hockey centres
HK Liepājas Metalurgs players
HK Riga players